Kenneth Campbell (born 19 August 1949) is a Jamaican boxer. He competed in the men's bantamweight event at the 1968 Summer Olympics.

References

1949 births
Living people
People from Clarendon Parish, Jamaica
Flyweight boxers
Bantamweight boxers
Jamaican male boxers
Olympic boxers of Jamaica
Boxers at the 1968 Summer Olympics
Boxers at the 1967 Pan American Games
Pan American Games competitors for Jamaica
Boxers at the 1966 British Empire and Commonwealth Games
Commonwealth Games silver medallists for Jamaica
Commonwealth Games medallists in boxing
20th-century Jamaican people
21st-century Jamaican people
Medallists at the 1966 British Empire and Commonwealth Games